Saturday Night Live is an American sketch comedy series created and produced by Lorne Michaels for most of the show's run. The show has aired on NBC since 1975.

These years saw many cast changes, most prominently Will Ferrell's exit in 2002 and Jimmy Fallon's exit in 2004. Cast members hired during this period that would later have a huge impact on the show include Fred Armisen and Amy Poehler.

Quality period (2000–2001)

The 2000–01 season marked the beginning of yet another transitional phase. While veterans such as Chris Kattan, Darrell Hammond and Will Ferrell still dominated the show, more time was being given to newer cast members such as Horatio Sanz and Jimmy Fallon (whose prodigious ability at impressions would be increasingly utilized). Both men were also criticized for regularly and self-consciously breaking character during many sketches.

Long-time cast member Molly Shannon left the cast at mid-season. This was also Jerry Minor's only season.

In 1999, Tina Fey became the show's first female head writer. With Colin Quinn's "Weekend Update" tenure over, Lorne Michaels teamed Fey with Jimmy Fallon this season, the first duo to anchor the segment since Christine Ebersole and Brian Doyle-Murray in the early 1980s. This pairing was well received by critics. Fey appeared occasionally as an extra before being hired as a cast member. Fey was a featured player during her first season and was then promoted to contract player, while still maintaining her position as head writer.

Chris Parnell was fired at the end of this season, only to be rehired during the next season.<ref>{{cite news|last1=Graham|first1=Mark|title=Archers Chris Parnell Talks Well-Endowed Cartoon Characters, Being Fired From SNL Twice|url=http://www.vulture.com/2010/01/chris_parnell.html|access-date=June 16, 2015|work=Vulture|date=January 14, 2010}}</ref> He was eventually fired a second time at the end of the 2005–06 season, this time for good.

2000 presidential election
The 2000–01 season was also noted for its well-received spoofing of that year's presidential campaign, with adroit critiques of all the primary nominees, but especially Al Gore and George W. Bush. The two candidates even appeared (separately) on a special with the cast in fall 2000. Will Ferrell's Bush impression coined the term "strategery" in a sketch mocking Bush's propensity for mispronunciations, while Darrell Hammond's Gore was complemented by his slow, deliberate drawl and use of the term "lockbox" during the show's debate sketches.

In April 2015, Ferrell stated that he thought his impression "humanised" Bush to the country and may have won him the election, and that Hammond's "rigid, robotic-like" take on Gore may have influenced the result also.

CastJimmy FallonWill Ferrell
Ana Gasteyer
Darrell Hammond
Chris Kattan
Tracy Morgan
Chris Parnell
Horatio Sanz
Molly Shannon (final episode: February 17, 2001)

Featuring
Rachel DratchTina FeyJerry Minor
Maya Rudolph

bold denotes "Weekend Update" anchor

Post 9/11 (2001–2002)

The 2001–02 season could be called more "stable" than the previous season. Rachel Dratch, Tina Fey, and Maya Rudolph were all upgraded to contract status for this season. Ana Gasteyer went on maternity leave at the end of the season. After her daughter was born, she decided not to return to the show. Amy Poehler was upgraded to contract status quickly after being hired this season. Featured player Jeff Richards became the first former Mad TV cast member to join SNL.

The 2001–02 season was the last to feature Will Ferrell as a cast member. After seven seasons, Ferrell left the show after recently becoming the highest paid cast member in SNL's history. The last segment of the season finale featured an homage to Ferrell by the rest of the cast reflecting on what he brought to the show; it remains one of the only full-fledged farewells to a cast member in SNL history. He and Darrell Hammond shared the honour of longest-serving cast members during this season.

Fallout from the 9/11 terrorist attacks
The first-season premiere after the September 11 attacks (hosted by Reese Witherspoon) opened with then-New York City mayor Rudolph Giuliani and firefighters, as well as a performance of "The Boxer" by Paul Simon. The mayor said that "Having our city’s institutions up and running sends a message that New York City is open for business." It signified that the New York-based series was deeply affected by the terrorist attack. Witherspoon later stated that she thought Lorne Michaels "did an incredible job getting that show back on its feet and making America laugh again". As a result, the political commentary was scaled back. As time passed, the show gave more attention to political humor, but earlier attempts were seen by critics as tame, evidence that the show had, over the decades, gone from counterculture to safe and mainstream. Robert Smigel's cartoons, however, retained their bite and became heavily featured on the show.

Cast
Rachel DratchJimmy FallonWill FerrellTina FeyAna Gasteyer
Darrell Hammond
Chris Kattan
Tracy Morgan
Chris Parnell (first episode back: March 2, 2002)
Amy Poehler (upgraded to repertory status: January 12, 2002)
Maya Rudolph
Horatio Sanz

Featuring
Dean Edwards
Seth Meyers
Jeff Richards

bold denotes "Weekend Update" anchor

More cast changes (2002–2003)

The 2002–03 season would see more cast turnover, with Fred Armisen and Will Forte joining the cast and Chris Kattan and Tracy Morgan both opting to leave the show at the end of the season. Dean Edwards was let go after the season finale.

Cast
Rachel DratchJimmy FallonTina FeyDarrell Hammond
Chris Kattan
Tracy Morgan
Chris Parnell
Amy Poehler
Maya Rudolph
Horatio Sanz

Featuring 
Fred Armisen
Dean Edwards
Will Forte
Seth Meyers
Jeff Richards

bold denotes "Weekend Update" anchor

Fallon leaves (2003–2004)

The 2003–04 season would introduce a remodelled stage, modelled after the Grand Central Terminal.

Jimmy Fallon decided to leave at the end of this season, announcing his retirement from the cast at the end of his last "Weekend Update". Jeff Richards mysteriously disappeared from the cast after the episode hosted by Nick Lachey and Jessica Simpson. In an interview, Richards said he left on his own terms to branch out into other projects, though there have been rumors that he was fired for creative differences between himself and the director.

Finesse Mitchell and Kenan Thompson are hired to replace Tracy Morgan and Dean Edwards as the show's male African-American cast members. Thompson was the first SNL cast member to be younger than the show itself (Thompson was born in 1978, three years after SNL premiered) and the first cast member to get his start on a mainstream children's show (Thompson was a cast member on the Nickelodeon sketch show, All That).

Cast
Rachel DratchJimmy FallonTina Fey'''
Will Forte
Darrell Hammond
Seth Meyers
Chris Parnell
Amy Poehler
Jeff Richards (final episode: January 17, 2004)
Maya Rudolph
Horatio SanzFeaturingFred Armisen
Finesse Mitchell
Kenan Thompson

bold denotes "Weekend Update" anchor

Rebuilding year (2004–2005)

The 2004–05 season brought changes to the show after Fallon's leaving. Most notably, Tina Fey and Amy Poehler co-anchored "Weekend Update", the first time that two women were given the job.

Rob Riggle, an officer in the U.S. Marine Corps Reserve, and UCB alum, joined the cast as a featured player in what would be his only season. Riggle would go on to become a correspondent on The Daily Show with Jon Stewart a year later. He would become the third SNL cast member to join The Daily Show after leaving SNL (along with A. Whitney Brown and Nancy Walls) and is the first, and so far only, SNL cast member to have served in the U.S. Marines. In addition to Riggle, Jason Sudeikis (previously a writer on the show since 2003) joined the cast as a featured player with only three episodes left in the season.

Ashlee Simpson incident
An embarrassing event in the career of pop singer Ashlee Simpson occurred live on October 23, 2004. Simpson's second performance of the evening opened with the sound of her pre-recorded voice heard singing the song she had already performed earlier. Despite a quick fadeout, it was obvious that what was heard was not the live voice of the singer. A flustered Simpson did an improvised dance and then left the stage. The New York Times said that the error "exposed [Simpson's] use of prerecorded vocals on live television." Simpson's father said that her use of a prerecorded track was necessitated that evening by hoarseness caused by acid reflux disease. The incident subsequently inspired several SNL jokes (including a cold opening where Osama bin Laden [played by Seth Meyers] calls America out for allowing a singer to use backing tracks during a live show) and a few jokes on Saturday Night Lives rival show, MADtv. When questioned by reporters, Lorne Michaels initially denied, then acknowledged, that this was not the first time so-called "backing tracks" had ever been used on SNL. In October 2005, Simpson returned as a musical guest, performing without incident.

Cast
Fred Armisen
Rachel DratchTina FeyWill Forte
Darrell Hammond
Seth Meyers
Chris ParnellAmy Poehler'Maya Rudolph
Horatio SanzFeaturing''
Finesse Mitchell
Rob Riggle
Jason Sudeikis (first episode: May 7, 2005)
Kenan Thompson

bold denotes "Weekend Update" anchor

References

2000
Saturday Night Live history 2000
Saturday Night Live 2000-2005